Stanley Stahl (1924–1999) was an American banker and real estate investor from New York City.

Early life
Stanley Stahl was born to a Jewish family on June 16, 1924 in New York City. His father, Max Stahl, was a butcher in Brooklyn. He had a sister, Beatrice Marans.

Stahl graduated from New York University, where he received a bachelor's degree in accounting. He served in the United States Army.

Career
Stahl started his career as a real estate broker in Manhattan. He invested in Manhattan real estate, eventually owning both 277 Park Avenue in Midtown Manhattan and The Ansonia on the Upper West Side. He was also the co-owner of the Lunt-Fontanne Theatre with the Nederlander Organization. In 1982, he acquired the AT&T Building located between 55th Street and 56th Street in Manhattan (now owned by Joseph Chetrit).

In 1969, Stahl co-founded Hirstan Associates, a real estate investment firm, with Abraham Hirschfeld. They owned buildings in Sutton Place. However, when Hirschfeld wanted out of the partnership in 1992, Stahl accused the latter of unfair profit distribution. In retaliation, Stahl was accused of racial discrimination against tenants. In 1998, Hirschfeld was indicted of hiring a hitman to murder Stahl in 1996.

Stahl acquired the Apple Bank for Savings for US$174 million in a hostile takeover in 1990. He was its sole owner.

Personal life
Stahl was married twice. His second wife was named Cherie. He had a son, Gregory Stahl, a stepson, Peter Neger, and a stepdaughter, Simi Matera. Stahl was indicted of bribing an Internal Revenue Service agent and found guilty in 1977, but he won on appeal.

Death
Stahl died of a stroke on August 5, 1999 in a hospital in New York City.

References

1924 births
1999 deaths
Jewish American military personnel
People from New York City
New York University alumni
American bankers
Jewish American bankers
20th-century American businesspeople
American real estate businesspeople
20th-century American Jews